Ahmet Düverioğlu (born 4 March 1993), known as Ahmad Hekmat Al-Dwairi in Jordan, is a Turkish-Jordanian international professional basketball player who last played for Frutti Extra Bursaspor of the Turkish Basketbol Süper Ligi (BSL). He uses his Turkish passport in the EuroLeague competition. Standing at a height of 2.13 m (7 ft 0 in), he plays at the center position.

Professional career

Early years
Düverioğlu began playing professional basketball for Zain in the Jordanian Premier Basketball League in 2009. In 2010, he moved to the Jordanian club Al Riyadi. Then he transferred to A.S.U., where he won two Jordanian league titles. After two years with A.S.U., in 2014, he moved to Serbia, and signed with Mega Vizura.

Anadolu Efes
After terminating his contract with Mega Vizura, where he did not play any game, Düverioğlu moved to Turkey (where he was born, and already had citizenship), and signed with Pertevniyal of the Turkish 2nd Division, which was a satellite club of Anadolu Efes. After the 2013–14 season ended, he moved to Anadolu Efes, where he won the 2015 Turkish Presidential Cup. He played in the EuroLeague with the same team in the 2015-16 season. His best performance with Anadolu Efes was against Laboral Kutxa, in game where he had 8 points, 3 rebounds, and 1 block, in 9 mins 40 seconds of playing time.

Fenerbahçe
On 28 July 2016, Düverioğlu signed a three-year contract with the Turkish club Fenerbahçe. He started his Fenerbahçe career by winning the 2016 Turkish Presidential Cup. Under the guidance of Željko Obradović, his playing time and performance increased notably with Fenerbahçe. At the beginning of the 2016–17 season, which was the most successful in the history of the club, Düverioğlu won the 2017 Turkish Presidential Cup with Fener. At the end of the season, he won the 2016–17 Turkish Super League and the 2016–17 EuroLeague, completing a continental treble. His best performance with Fenerbahçe in the EuroLeague was against Panathinaikos Superfoods, in game where he had 13 points, 4 rebounds, 1 assist and 1 block, in 15 mins 30 seconds of playing time.

In 2017–18 EuroLeague, Fenerbahçe made it to the 2018 EuroLeague Final Four, its fourth consecutive Final Four appearance. Eventually, they lost to Real Madrid with 80–85 in the final game.

On June 20, 2022, Düverioğlu officially parted ways with the Turkish club after six seasons.

Bursaspor
On June 21, 2022, he has signed with Frutti Extra Bursaspor of the Turkish Basketbol Süper Ligi (BSL).

International career
Düverioğlu, under the name of Ahmad Al-Dwairi, is a regular senior Jordan national team player. He played for Jordan's national team at the 2014 Asian Games, averaging 11.5 points and 9.5 rebounds per game. He also played at the 2014 FIBA Asia Cup, where he averaged 12.7 points and 10.0 rebounds per game.

Personal life
His father is Jordanian and his mother is Turkish. He was born in Istanbul, Turkey. He has Turkish citizenship due to his Turkish origin from his mother.

References

Video references

External links
 Ahmad Al-Dwairi at fiba.com (archive)
 Ahmet Düverioğlu at euroleague.net
 Ahmet Düverioğlu at eurobasket.com
 Ahmad Al-Dwairi at asia-basket.com
 Ahmet Düverioğlu at tblstat.net

1993 births
Living people
2019 FIBA Basketball World Cup players
Al Riyadi Amman basketball players
Anadolu Efes S.K. players
Applied Science University basketball players
Asian Games competitors for Jordan
Basketball players at the 2014 Asian Games
Bursaspor Basketbol players
Centers (basketball)
Fenerbahçe men's basketball players
Jordanian men's basketball players
Jordanian people of Turkish descent
Pertevniyal S.K. players
Basketball players from Istanbul
Turkish men's basketball players
Turkish people of Jordanian descent
Zain Club basketball players